Joginapally Santosh Kumar (born 7 December 1976) is a political leader from the Telangana Rashtra Samithi and presently a Member of the Parliament of India representing Telangana in the Rajya Sabha, the upper house of the Indian Parliament. He won the election on 23 March 2018. He is the Managing Director of Telugu media house, Namasthe Telangana in Telangana, India. He is presently a General Secretary in Telangana Rashtra Samithi. He was running for Member of Parliament, Rajya Sabha.

Early life
He was born in Kodurupaka village in Boinpally mandal, Karimnagar, Telangana to Ravinder Rao and Shashikala. He moved to Hyderabad for doing his Intermediate and Degree after finishing tenth Standard in his native village. He completed his MBA in HR from Pune University. He is the nephew of Chief Minister of Telangana, Kalvakuntla Chandrashekhar Rao’s co-brother.

Career
He joined TRS upon the advise from KCR before the inception of the TRS Party in 2018. He worked as a personal assistant to KCR ever since. He looked after party affairs from the beginning. He became Executive Director of T-news in 2012 and is presently the Managing Director of Namasthe Telangana.

He is presently looking after day-to-day activities of TRS party and is personal secretary of K. Chandrashekhar Rao.

He is running for Rajya Sabha to take care of important party affairs in Delhi.

Personal life
He is married to Rohini. They have two sons, Ishaan and Shreyaan.

References

Telangana Rashtra Samithi politicians
People from Karimnagar
Telangana politicians
Rajya Sabha members from Telangana
1976 births
Living people